Sabinella chathamensis is a species of small sea snail, a marine  gastropod  mollusk in the family Eulimidae. The scientific name of this species was first published in 2010 by Bartsch.

References

Eulimidae
Gastropods described in 1917